The 1957 Northwestern Wildcats baseball team represented Northwestern University in the 1957 NCAA University Division baseball season. The head coach was Fred Lindstrom, serving his 9th year. The Wildcats finished the season with a loss in the District IV Tournament Final.

Roster

Schedule 

! style="" | Regular Season
|- valign="top" 

|- align="center" bgcolor="#ccffcc"
| 7 || April ||  || Dyche Field • Evanston, Illinois || 18–2 || – || 0–0
|- align="center" bgcolor="#ccffcc"
|  || April || Great Lakes || Dyche Field • Evanston, Illinois || – || – || 0–0
|- align="center" bgcolor="#ccffcc"
|  || April || Great Lakes || Dyche Field • Evanston, Illinois || – || – || 0–0
|-

|- align="center" bgcolor="#ffcccc"
|  || May 1 || Notre Dame || Dyche Field • Evanston, Illinois || 4–8 || –1 || 0–0
|- align="center" bgcolor="#ccffcc"
|  || May || Glenview Air Base || Dyche Field • Evanston, Illinois || 26–0 || –1 || 0–0
|- align="center" bgcolor="#ccffcc"
|  || May 3 || at  || John Kobs Field • East Lansing, Michigan || 7–2 || –2 || 1–1
|- align="center" bgcolor="#ffcccc"
|  || May 4 || at  || Ray Fisher Stadium • Ann Arbor, Michigan || 3–10 || –2 || 1–1
|- align="center" bgcolor="#ffcccc"
|  || May 4 || at Michigan || Ray Fisher Stadium • Ann Arbor, Michigan || 5–12 || –3 || 1–2
|- align="center" bgcolor="#ccffcc"
|  || May 11 || vs  || Unknown • Unknown || 4–0 || –3 || 2–2
|- align="center" bgcolor="#ccffcc"
|  || May 11 || vs Indiana || Unknown • Unknown || 12–1 || –3 || 3–2
|- align="center" bgcolor="#ffcccc"
|  || May 15 || at Notre Dame || Unknown • Notre Dame, Indiana || 4–8 || –4 || 3–2
|- align="center" bgcolor="#ccffcc"
|  || May  ||  || Dyche Field • Evanston, Illinois || – || – || 4–2
|- align="center" bgcolor="#ccffcc"
|  || May 24 || at  || Illinois Field • Champaign, Illinois || 1–0 || 12–4 || 5–2
|-

|-
|-
! style="" | Postseason
|- valign="top"

|- align="center" bgcolor="#ffcccc"
| 17 || May 28 || at  || Hyames Field • Kalamazoo, Michigan || 1–11 || 12–5 || 5–2
|- align="center" bgcolor="#ccffcc"
| 18 || May 29 || vs  || Hyames Field • Kalamazoo, Michigan || 11–2 || 13–5 || 5–2
|- align="center" bgcolor="#ccffcc"
| 19 || May 29 || at Western Michigan || Hyames Field • Kalamazoo, Michigan || 10–9 || 14–5 || 5–2
|- align="center" bgcolor="#ccffcc"
| 20 || May 30 || vs Notre Dame || Hyames Field • Kalamazoo, Michigan || 9–2 || 15–5 || 5–2
|- align="center" bgcolor="#ffcccc"
| 21 || May 31 || vs Notre Dame || Hyames Field • Kalamazoo, Michigan || 1–6 || 15–6 || 5–2
|-

Awards and honors 
Ed Broeker
 First Team All-Big Ten

Al Kennedy
 Second Team All-Big Ten

Chuck Lindstrom
 Second Team All-Big Ten

Tom Scheuerman
 First Team All-Big TenThe following is a listing of the selections listed in the 2018 Northwestern Baseball Media Guide on nusports.com.

References 

Northwestern Wildcats baseball seasons
Northwestern Wildcats baseball
Big Ten Conference baseball champion seasons
Northwestern